Sarcophrynium villosum is a species of plant in the Marantaceae family. It is found in Cameroon and Gabon. Its natural habitat is subtropical or tropical moist lowland forests. It is threatened by habitat loss.

References

villosum
Endangered plants
Flora of Gabon
Taxa named by Karl Moritz Schumann
Plants described in 1902
Flora of Cameroon
Taxonomy articles created by Polbot